This is a list of notable buildings in Ottawa, Ontario, Canada.

Museums

Portrait Gallery of Canada
National Gallery of Canada
Canadian Museum of History (in Gatineau)
Canadian War Museum
 Victoria Memorial Museum Building, housing the Canadian Museum of Nature
Canada Science and Technology Museum
Laurier House
Bytown Museum

Government buildings

Parliament of Canada
Peace Tower
Library of Parliament
Ottawa City Hall
Ottawa Courthouse
Supreme Court of Canada
National Library and Archives of Canada
Langevin Block
Cartier Square Drill Hall
East and West Memorial Buildings
Bank of Canada building
Confederation Building (Ottawa)
Major-General George R Pearkes Building, sometimes referred to as "National Defence Headquarters"
Government Conference Centre
Sir Leonard Tilley Building
Ottawa Convention Centre formerly Ottawa Congress Centre

Official residences
Rideau Hall
24 Sussex Drive
Stornoway
7 Rideau Gate

Embassies and high commissions
See: List of embassies and high commissions in Ottawa

Algerian (Fleck/Paterson House)
American
Angolan (Panet House)
British
Brunei Darussalam (Stadcona Hall)
P. R. Chinese
Croatian (Toller House)
French
German
Russian

Office towers
Lester B. Pearson Building
L'Esplanade Laurier
Place de Ville
Place Bell
World Exchange Plaza
C. D. Howe Building
Thomas D'Arcy McGee Building
R. H. Coats Building
CBC Ottawa Broadcast Centre
Heritage Place
Place du Portage (in Gatineau)
Terrasses de la Chaudière (in Gatineau) - the tallest building in the National Capital Region
Constitution Square
John G. Diefenbaker Building

Schools
Lisgar Collegiate Institute
Glebe Collegiate Institute
Ashbury College
Elmwood School
Immaculata High School
Hawthorne Public School
Algonquin College
Earl of March secondary school

Religious buildings

Christ Church Cathedral
Dominion-Chalmers United Church
Notre-Dame Cathedral

See also: List of religious buildings in Ottawa, List of Ottawa churches, List of Ottawa synagogues, List of Ottawa mosques

Other
Château Laurier
Lord Elgin Hotel
Britannia Yacht Club
Bayshore Shopping Centre
Canadian Tire Centre (formerly Scotiabank Place)
Goodwin House
Ben Franklin Place
Lansdowne Park
National Arts Centre
Former Ogilvy's Department Store
The Ottawa Hospital
Ottawa Macdonald–Cartier International Airport
Ottawa Public Library Main Branch
Ottawa Train Station
Ottawa Curling Club
Ottawa Baseball Stadium
Rideau Centre
Royal Canadian Mint
St. Laurent Shopping Centre

Significant demolished buildings
Capitol Cinema
Daly Building
Dey's Arena
Former city halls:
First city hall
Second city hall
Russell Hotel
Ottawa Auditorium
Ottawa Congress Centre
Lorne Building

Map of major buildings

A map of downtown Ottawa, including parts of Lower Town, Sandy Hill, and downtown Hull.
Click on the stars to read articles on individual buildings.

See also
 
Architecture of Ottawa
List of buildings
List of designated heritage properties in Ottawa
List of Ottawa roads
List of tallest buildings in Ottawa-Gatineau
List of National Historic Sites of Canada in Ottawa
List of shopping malls in Ottawa

Ottawa

Buildings